Kiss of a Butterfly is a 2006 Russian crime action film directed by Anton Sivers. The world premiere of the film was held July 21, 2006.

Synopsis
Mysterious Chinese woman Li suddenly invades the serene life of Nikolai Orlanov, a young and successful computer genius. Without remembering who she is and how she got to bed with him, Orlanov soon realizes that he fell for the bait of his own emotions. The connection with the girl not only overturns his entire life, but also puts her at risk. Criminal clients, the Triads, angered bosses and love ...

Cast
Sergey Bezrukov – Nikolai Orlanov
Lan Yan – Li
Andrei Astrakhantsev – Lavrik
Leonid Gromov – The Marshal
Anna Dubrovskaya – Anzhela
Helga Filippova – Anya
Laura Lauri – False-Li
Georgi Pitskhelauri – Aleks
Sergei Shekhovtsov – Kravtsov
Konstantin Shelestun – Bobka

References

External links

 

2006 films
2000s crime action films
Russian crime action films
Russian romance films
2000s Russian-language films
Triad films
2000s Hong Kong films